Mill Spring is an unincorporated community in Polk County, North Carolina, United States. Mill Spring has a post office with ZIP code 28756. Mill Spring is named after Colonel Ambrose Mills. He founded a saw mill and post office in the community.

Mill Spring was the hometown of Bryant H. Womack, recipient of the Medal of Honor for actions during the Korean War.

The Rev. Joshua D. Jones House was added to the National Register of Historic Places in 1991.

The Tryon International Equestrian Center, in Mill Spring, was the location of the 2018 FEI World Equestrian Games.

See also
 Lake Adger, northwest of town

References

Unincorporated communities in Polk County, North Carolina
Unincorporated communities in North Carolina